The Indian National Congress (INC) is one of the two major political parties in India. The prominent members of the party are the president Sonia Gandhi, vice-president Rahul Gandhi, Prime minister Manmohan Singh. INC took part in the elections alongside other members of the United Progressive Alliance.The INC announced that its campaign for the election would be led by Prime minister Manmohan Singh, party chairperson Sonia Gandhi, and general secretary Rahul Gandhi.

Seat Sharing:

Results

References 

Indian National Congress campaigns
Indian general election campaigns
2009 Indian general election